Vida AB is the largest privately owned sawmill group of Sweden, with its approximately 1000 employees. The sawmills are strategically placed in or near the huge forest areas in the province of Småland and the western Götaland province. About 85% of the production is being exported to Europe, USA, and Asia.

Forestry is an important economic activity in Sweden.

Vida is currently sponsoring the successful Swedish heptathlon athlete Carolina Klüft. Vida also owns the naming rights for Vida Arena, located in Växjö, until 2024.

References
Official website

Forest products companies
Companies based in Kronoberg County
Companies with year of establishment missing